Elina Orvokki Gustafsson (born 6 February 1992) is a retired Finnish boxer. She won a bronze medal in the welterweight category at the 2016 AIBA Women's World Boxing Championships and a gold medal at the 2018 European Amateur Boxing Championships.

In November 2020, Gustafsson announced finishing her career due to health issues.

She is gay according to her Instagram and is dating a Finnish professional dancer and choreographer Ansku Bergström, with whom she was competing in the Finnish version of Dancing With The Stars. The two fell in love during the dance practices and published their relationship on 12th of December 2021.

References

1992 births
People from Pori
European Games competitors for Finland
Finnish women boxers
Boxers at the 2019 European Games
AIBA Women's World Boxing Championships medalists
Light-welterweight boxers
Welterweight boxers
Living people
LGBT boxers
Finnish LGBT sportspeople
Lesbian sportswomen